Hanningfield may refer to:

People
Paul White, Baron Hanningfield, British politician

Places
East Hanningfield
Hanningfield Green
Hanningfield Reservoir
South Hanningfield
West Hanningfield